Coral Bay may mean:

Coral Bay, Western Australia
Coral Bay, United States Virgin Islands, a town on the island of St. John
Coral Bay, Cyprus